The pomegranate (Punica granatum) is a fruit-bearing deciduous shrub in the family Lythraceae, subfamily Punicoideae, that grows between  tall.

The pomegranate was originally described throughout the Mediterranean region. It was introduced into Spanish America in the late 16th century and into California by Spanish settlers in 1769.

The fruit is typically in season in the Southern Hemisphere from March to May, and in the Northern Hemisphere from September to February. As intact sarcotestas or juice, pomegranates are used in baking, cooking, juice blends, meal garnishes, smoothies, and alcoholic beverages, such as cocktails and wine.

Pomegranates are widely cultivated throughout the Middle East and Caucasus region, north and tropical Africa, Iran, the Indian subcontinent, Central Asia, the drier parts of Southeast Asia, and the Mediterranean Basin.

Etymology 

The name pomegranate derives from medieval Latin  "apple" and  "seeded". Possibly stemming from the old French word for the fruit, the pomegranate was known in early English as "apple of Grenada"—a term which today survives only in heraldic blazons. This is a folk etymology, confusing the Latin granatus with the name of the Spanish city of Granada, which derives from Arabic.

Garnet derives from Old French  by metathesis, from Medieval Latin  as used in a different meaning "of a dark red color". This derivation may have originated from pomum granatum, describing the color of pomegranate pulp, or from granum, referring to "red dye, cochineal".

The modern French term for pomegranate, has given its name to the military grenade.

Description 

Some fruitless varieties are grown for the flowers alone.

Fruit, sarcotesta and seeds

Red-purple in color, the pomegranate fruit husk has two parts: an outer, hard pericarp, and an inner, spongy mesocarp (white "albedo"), which comprises the fruit inner wall where seeds attach. Membranes of the mesocarp are organized as nonsymmetric chambers that contain seeds inside sarcotestas, which are embedded without attachment to the mesocarp. Containing juice, the sarcotesta is formed as a thin membrane derived from the epidermal cells of the seeds. The number of seeds in a pomegranate can vary from 200 to about 1,400.

Botanically, the edible fruit is a berry with seeds and pulp produced from the ovary of a single flower. The fruit is intermediate in size between a lemon and a grapefruit,  in diameter with a rounded shape and thick, reddish husk.

In mature fruits, the juice obtained by compressing the seeds yields a sour flavor due to low pH (4.4) and high contents of polyphenols, which may cause a red indelible stain on fabrics. Primarily, the pigmentation of pomegranate juice results from the presence of anthocyanins and ellagitannins.

Cultivation 
P. granatum is grown for its fruit crop, and as ornamental trees and shrubs in parks and gardens. Mature specimens can develop sculptural twisted-bark multiple trunks and a distinctive overall form. Pomegranates are drought-tolerant, and can be grown in dry areas with either a Mediterranean winter rainfall climate or in summer rainfall climates. In wetter areas, they can be prone to root decay from fungal diseases.

Insect pests of the pomegranate can include the butterflies Virachola isocrates, Iraota timoleon, Deudorix epijarbas, and the leaf-footed bug Leptoglossus zonatus, and fruit flies and ants are attracted to unharvested ripe fruit. Pomegranate grows easily from seed, but is commonly propagated from  hardwood cuttings to avoid the genetic variation of seedlings. Air layering is also an option for propagation, but grafting fails.

Varieties 
P. granatum var. nana is a dwarf variety of P. granatum popularly planted as an ornamental plant in gardens and larger containers, and used as a bonsai specimen tree. It could well be a wild form with a distinct origin. It has gained the Royal Horticultural Society's Award of Garden Merit.

The only other species in the genus Punica is the Socotran pomegranate (P. protopunica), which is endemic to the Socotran archipelago of four islands located in the Arabian Sea, the largest island of which is also known as Socotra. The territory is part of Yemen. It differs in having pink (not red) flowers and smaller, less sweet fruit.

Cultivars 

P. granatum has more than 500 named cultivars, but evidently has considerable synonymy in which the same genotype is named differently across regions of the world.

Several characteristics between pomegranate genotypes vary for identification, consumer preference, preferred use, and marketing, the most important of which are fruit size, exocarp color (ranging from yellow to purple, with pink and red most common), seed-coat color (ranging from white to red), the hardness of seed, maturity, juice content and its acidity, sweetness, and astringency.

Production and export
The leading producers globally are India and China followed by Iran, Turkey, Afghanistan, the US, Iraq, Pakistan, Syria and Spain.
During 2019, Chile, Peru, Egypt, Israel, India, and Turkey supplied pomegranates to the European market. Chile was the main supplier to the United States market, which has a limited supply from Southern California. China was self-sufficient for its pomegranate supply in 2019, while other South Asia markets were supplied mainly by India. Pomegranate production and exports in South Africa competed with South American shipments in 2012–18, with export destinations including Europe, the Middle East, the United Kingdom, and Russia. South Africa imports pomegranates mainly from Israel.

History 

The pomegranate is native to a region from modern-day Iran to northern India. Pomegranates have been cultivated throughout the Middle East, South Asia, and Mediterranean region for several millennia, and it is also cultivated in the Central Valley of California and in Arizona. Pomegranates may have been domesticated as early as the fifth millennium BC, as they were one of the first fruit trees to be domesticated in the eastern Mediterranean region.

Carbonized exocarp of the fruit has been identified in early Bronze Age levels of Tell es-Sultan (Jericho) in the West Bank, as well as late Bronze Age levels of Hala Sultan Tekke on Cyprus and Tiryns. A large, dry pomegranate was found in the tomb of Djehuty, the butler of Queen Hatshepsut in Egypt; Mesopotamian cuneiform records mention pomegranates from the mid-third millennium BC onwards.

Waterlogged pomegranate remains have been identified at the circa 14th century BC Uluburun shipwreck off the coast of Turkey. Other goods on the ship include perfume, ivory and gold jewelry, suggesting that pomegranates at this time may have been considered a luxury good. Other archaeological finds of pomegranate remains from the Late Bronze Age have been found primarily in elite residences, supporting this inference.

It is also extensively grown in southern China and in Southeast Asia, whether originally spread along the route of the Silk Road or brought by sea traders. Kandahar is famous in Afghanistan for its high-quality pomegranates.

Although not native to Korea or Japan, the pomegranate is widely grown there and many cultivars have been developed. It is widely used for bonsai because of its flowers and for the unusual twisted bark the older specimens can attain. The term "balaustine" is also used for a pomegranate-red color.

Spanish colonists later introduced the fruit to the Caribbean and America (Spanish America), but in the English colonies, it was less at home: "Don't use the pomegranate inhospitably, a stranger that has come so far to pay his respects to thee," the English Quaker Peter Collinson wrote to the botanizing John Bartram in Philadelphia, 1762. "Plant it against the side of thy house, nail it close to the wall. In this manner it thrives wonderfully with us, and flowers beautifully, and bears fruit this hot year. I have twenty-four on one tree... Doctor Fothergill says, of all trees this is most salutiferous to mankind."

The pomegranate had been introduced as an exotic to England the previous century, by John Tradescant the Elder, but the disappointment that it did not set fruit there led to its repeated introduction to the American colonies, even New England. It succeeded in the South: Bartram received a barrel of pomegranates and oranges from a correspondent in Charleston, South Carolina, 1764. John Bartram partook of "delitious" pomegranates with Noble Jones at Wormsloe Plantation, near Savannah, Georgia, in September 1765. Thomas Jefferson planted pomegranates at Monticello in 1771; he had them from George Wythe of Williamsburg.

Culinary use 

After the pomegranate is opened by scoring it with a knife and breaking it open, the seeds are separated from the peel and from the internal pulp membranes. Separating the seeds is easier in a bowl of water because the seeds sink and the inedible pulp floats. Freezing the entire fruit also makes it easier to separate. Another effective way of quickly harvesting the seeds is to cut the pomegranate in half, score each half of the exterior rind four to six times, hold the pomegranate half over a bowl, and smack the rind with a large spoon. The seeds should eject from the pomegranate directly into the bowl, leaving only a dozen or more deeply embedded seeds to remove.

Pomegranate juice can be sweet or sour, but most fruits are moderate in taste, with sour notes from the acidic ellagitannins contained in the juice. Pomegranate juice has long been a popular drink in Europe and the Middle East, and is now widely distributed in the United States and Canada.

Grenadine syrup originally consisted of thickened and sweetened pomegranate juice, now is usually a sales name for a syrup based on various berries, citric acid, and food coloring, mainly used in cocktail mixing.

Before tomatoes (a New World fruit) arrived in the Middle East, pomegranate juice, molasses, and vinegar were widely used in many Iranian foods, and are still found in traditional recipes such as fesenjān, a thick sauce made from pomegranate juice and ground walnuts, usually spooned over duck or other poultry and rice, and in ash-e anar (pomegranate soup).

Dried whole seeds can often be obtained in ethnic Indian markets. These seeds are separated from the flesh, dried for 10–15 days, and used as an acidic agent for chutney and curry preparation. Ground anardana is also used, which results in a deeper flavoring in dishes and prevents the seeds from getting stuck in teeth. Seeds of the wild pomegranate variety known as daru from the Himalayas are regarded as high-quality sources for this spice.

Dried pomegranate seeds, found in some natural specialty food markets, still contain some residual water, maintaining a natural sweet and tart flavor. Dried seeds can be used in several culinary applications, such as trail mix, granola bars, or as a topping for salad, yogurt, or ice cream.

In the Caucasus, pomegranate is used mainly for juice. "pomegranate wine") is usually served with fish or tika kabab.

In Turkey, pomegranate sauce is used as a salad dressing, to marinate meat, or simply to drink straight. Pomegranate seeds are also used in salads and sometimes as garnish for desserts such as güllaç. Pomegranate syrup or molasses is used in muhammara, a roasted red pepper, walnut, and garlic spread popular in Syria and Turkey.

In Greece, pomegranate is used in many recipes, including kollivozoumi, a creamy broth made from boiled wheat, pomegranates, and raisins, legume salad with wheat and pomegranate, traditional Middle Eastern lamb kebabs with pomegranate glaze, pomegranate eggplant relish, and avocado-pomegranate dip. Pomegranate is also made into a liqueur, and as a popular fruit confectionery used as ice cream topping, mixed with yogurt, or spread as jam on toast.

In Mexico, they are commonly used to adorn the traditional dish chiles en nogada, representing the red of the Mexican flag in the dish which evokes the green (poblano pepper), white (nogada sauce) and red (pomegranate seeds) tricolor.

Nutrition 

The edible portion of raw pomegranate is 78% water, 19% carbohydrates, 2% protein, and 1% fat (table). A  serving of pomegranate sarcotesta provides 12% of the Daily Value (DV) for vitamin C, 16% DV for vitamin K, and 10% DV for folate (table). Pomegranate seeds are a rich source of dietary fiber (20% DV) which is entirely contained in the edible seeds.

Research

Phytochemicals 

Processing
The phenolic content of pomegranate juice is degraded by processing and pasteurization techniques.

Juice
The most abundant phytochemicals in pomegranate juice are polyphenols, including the hydrolyzable tannins called ellagitannins formed when ellagic acid and gallic acid bind with a carbohydrate to form pomegranate ellagitannins, also known as punicalagins. The red color of the juice is attributed to anthocyanins, such as delphinidin, cyanidin, and pelargonidin glycosides. Generally, an increase in juice pigmentation occurs during fruit ripening. 

Peel
Pomegranate peel contains high amount of polyphenols, condensed tannins, catechins, and prodelphinidins. 
The higher phenolic content of the peel yields extracts for use in dietary supplements and food preservatives.

Seed
Pomegranate seed oil contains punicic acid (65%), palmitic acid (5%), stearic acid (2%), oleic acid (6%), and linoleic acid (7%).

Illegal health claims 

Despite limited research data, manufacturers and marketers of pomegranate juice have liberally used results from preliminary research to promote products. In February 2010, the FDA issued a warning letter to one such manufacturer, POM Wonderful, for using published literature to make illegal claims of unproven anti-disease effects.

In May 2016, the US Federal Trade Commission declared that POM Wonderful could not make health claims in its advertising, followed by a US Supreme Court ruling that declined a request by POM Wonderful to review the court ruling, upholding the FTC decision.

Symbolism

Ancient Iran and Persia 
Iran is the second-largest producer and largest exporter of pomegranates in the world. The fruit's juice and paste have a role in Iranian cuisine, e.g. chicken, ghormas, and refreshment bars. Pomegranate skins may be used to stain wool and silk in the carpet industry.

Ancient Egypt 
Ancient Egyptians regarded the pomegranate as a symbol of prosperity and ambition. It was referred to by the Semitic names of jnhm or nhm. According to the Ebers Papyrus, one of the oldest medical writings from around 1500 BC, Egyptians used the pomegranate for treatment of tapeworm and other infections.

Ancient and Modern Greece 

A pomegranate is displayed on coins from Side, as Side was the name for pomegranate in the local language, which is the city's name. The ancient Greek city of Side was in Pamphylia, a former region on the southern Mediterranean coast of Asia Minor (modern-day Antalya province, Turkey).

The Greeks were familiar with the fruit far before it was introduced to Rome via Carthage, and it figures in multiple myths and artworks. In Ancient Greek mythology, the pomegranate was known as the "fruit of the dead", and believed to have sprung from the blood of Adonis.

The myth of Persephone, the goddess of the underworld, prominently features her consumption of pomegranate seeds, requiring her to spend a certain number of months in the underworld every year. The number of seeds and therefore months vary. During the months that Persephone sits on the throne of the underworld beside her husband Hades, her mother Demeter mourned and no longer gave fertility to the earth. This was an ancient Greek explanation for the seasons.

According to Carl A. P. Ruck and Danny Staples, the chambered pomegranate is also a surrogate for the poppy's narcotic capsule, with its comparable shape and chambered interior. On a Mycenaean seal illustrated in Joseph Campbell's Occidental Mythology (1964), figure 19, the seated Goddess of the double-headed axe (the labrys) offers three poppy pods in her right hand and supports her breast with her left. She embodies both aspects of the dual goddess, life-giving and death-dealing at once.

The hunter Orion was represented as "marrying" Side, a name that in Boeotia means "pomegranate", thus consecrating the primal hunter to the goddess.

In another Greek myth, a girl named Side ("pomegranate") killed herself on her mother's grave in order to avoid suffering rape at the hands of her own father Ictinus. Her blood transformed into a pomegranate tree.

In the fifth century BC, Polycleitus took ivory and gold to sculpt the seated Argive Hera in her temple. She held a scepter in one hand and offered a pomegranate, like a "royal orb", in the other. "About the pomegranate I must say nothing," whispered the traveller Pausanias in the second century, "for its story is somewhat of a holy mystery." The pomegranate has a calyx shaped like a crown. In Jewish tradition, it has been seen as the original "design" for the proper crown.

Within the Heraion at the mouth of the Sele, near Paestum, Magna Graecia, is a chapel devoted to the Madonna del Granato, "Our Lady of the Pomegranate", "who by virtue of her epithet and the attribute of a pomegranate must be the Christian successor of the ancient Greek goddess Hera", observes the excavator of the Heraion of Samos, Helmut Kyrieleis.

In modern times, the pomegranate still holds strong symbolic meanings for the Greeks. When one buys a new home, it is conventional for a house guest to bring as a first gift a pomegranate, which is placed under/near the ikonostasi (home altar) of the house, as a symbol of abundance, fertility, and good luck. When Greeks commemorate their dead, they make kollyva as offerings, which consist of boiled wheat, mixed with sugar and decorated with pomegranate. Pomegranate decorations for the home are very common in Greece and sold in most home goods stores.

Ancient Israel and Judaism 

The pomegranate has an important role in Jewish tradition. The fruit is said to have 613 seeds representing the 613 commandments of the Torah. 

For example, pomegranates were known in Ancient Israel as the fruits that the scouts brought to Moses to demonstrate the fertility of the "promised land". The Book of Exodus describes the me'il ("robe of the ephod") worn by the Hebrew high priest as having pomegranates embroidered on the hem, alternating with golden bells, which could be heard as the high priest entered and left the Holy of Holies. According to the Books of Kings, the capitals of the two pillars (Jachin and Boaz) that stood in front of Solomon's Temple in Jerusalem were engraved with pomegranates. Solomon is said to have designed his coronet based on the pomegranate's "crown" (calyx).

Some Jewish scholars believe the pomegranate was the forbidden fruit in the Garden of Eden. Additionally, pomegranates are one of the Seven Species (Hebrew: שבעת המינים, Shiv'at Ha-Minim) of fruits and grains enumerated in the Hebrew Bible as special products of the Land of Israel, and the Songs of Solomon mentions pomegranate six times and contains this particular quote: "Thy lips are like a thread of scarlet, and thy speech is comely: thy temples are like a piece of a pomegranate within thy locks." (Song of Solomon 4:3).

Consuming pomegranates on Rosh Hashana is traditional because, with its numerous seeds, it symbolizes fruitfulness. Also, it is said to have 613 seeds, which corresponds with the 613 commandments of the Torah, but it was a misconception. This particular tradition is referred to in the opening pages of Ursula Dubosarsky's novel Theodora's Gift.

The pomegranate appeared on the ancient coins of Judea, and when not in use, the handles of Torah scrolls are sometimes covered with decorative silver globes similar in shape to pomegranates (rimmonim).

Pomegranates symbolize the mystical experience in the Jewish mystical tradition, or kabbalah, with the typical reference being to entering the "garden of pomegranates" or pardes rimonim; this is also the title of a book by the 16th-century mystic Moses ben Jacob Cordovero.

In European Christian motifs 

In the earliest incontrovertible appearance of Christ in a mosaic, a fourth-century floor mosaic from Hinton St Mary, Dorset, now in the British Museum, the bust of Christ and the chi rho are flanked by pomegranates.
Pomegranates continue to be a motif often found in Christian religious decoration. They are often woven into the fabric of vestments and liturgical hangings or wrought in metalwork. Pomegranates figure in many religious paintings by the likes of Sandro Botticelli and Leonardo da Vinci, often in the hands of the Virgin Mary or the infant Jesus. The fruit, broken or bursting open, is a symbol of the fullness of Jesus' suffering and resurrection.

In the Eastern Orthodox Church, pomegranate seeds may be used in kolyva, a dish prepared for memorial services, as a symbol of the sweetness of the heavenly kingdom.

In Islam 
Chapter 55 of the Quran mentions the pomegranate as a "favour" among many to be offered to those fearful to the "Lord" in "two Gardens".

Armenia 

The pomegranate is one of the main fruits in Armenian culture (alongside apricots and grapes). Its juice is used with Armenian food, heritage, or wine. The pomegranate is a symbol in Armenia, representing fertility, abundance, and marriage. It is also a semireligious icon. For example, the fruit played an integral role in a wedding custom widely practiced in ancient Armenia; a bride was given a pomegranate fruit, which she threw against a wall, breaking it into pieces. Scattered pomegranate seeds ensured the bride future children.

Wild pomegranate can be found in Armenia, specifically in the Idjevan and Noyemberyan regions in the northeast, and in the Goris, Kapan, and Meghri regions in the southeast. They typically grow in foothill areas at elevations of 500-900m above sea level. Additionally, there are some settlements in the Ararat valley near Yerevan where wild pomegranates can be found.

The Color of Pomegranates, a movie directed by Sergei Parajanov, is a biography of the Armenian ashug Sayat-Nova (King of Song) which attempts to reveal the poet's life visually and poetically rather than literally.

Azerbaijan 

The pomegranate is considered one of the symbols of Azerbaijan. Annually in October, a cultural festival is held in Goychay, Azerbaijan known as the Goychay Pomegranate Festival. The festival features Azerbaijani fruit-cuisine mainly the pomegranates from Goychay, which is famous for its pomegranate growing industry. At the festival, a parade is held with traditional Azerbaijani dances and Azerbaijani music. Pomegranate was depicted on the official logo of the 2015 European Games held in Azerbaijan. Nar the Pomegranate was one of the two mascots of these games. Pomegranates were also featured on the jackets worn by Azerbaijani male athletes at the games' opening ceremony.

China 

Introduced to China during the Han Dynasty (206BC–220AD), the pomegranate, in older times, was considered an emblem of fertility and numerous progeny. This symbolism is a pun on the Chinese character 子 (zǐ) which, as well as meaning seed, also means "offspring", thus a fruit containing so many seeds is a sign of fecundity. Pictures of the ripe fruit with the seeds bursting forth were often hung in homes to bestow fertility and bless the dwelling with numerous offspring, an important facet of traditional Chinese culture.

India 
In some Hindu traditions, the pomegranate (Hindi: anār) symbolizes prosperity and fertility, and is associated with both Bhoomidevi (the earth goddess) and Lord Ganesha (the one fond of the many-seeded fruit).

Kurdistan 
Pomegranate is an important fruit and symbol in Kurdish culture. It is accepted as a symbol of abundance and a sacred fruit of ancient Kurdish religions. Pomegranate is used as a symbol of abundance in Kurdish carpets.

The Pomegranate Festival is an annual cultural and artistic festival held to exhibit and sell pomegranates, food products, and handicrafts.

Gallery

References

External links 

 Pomegranate - Trusted Health Information (MedlinePlus)

 
Abortifacients
Aphrodisiac foods
Crops originating from Asia
Edible fruits
Sour fruits
Flora of Central Asia
Flora of Nepal
Flora of Western Asia
Fruits originating in Asia
Heraldic charges
Indian spices
Lythraceae
Plants described in 1753
Plants used in bonsai
Symbols of Hades
Flora of Iran
Flora of Israel
Flora of Palestine (region)
Fruit trees
Plants in the Bible
Plant dyes